Veerabhimanyu is a 1965 Indian Telugu-language Hindu mythological film produced by Sunderlal Nahta and Doondi and directed by V. Madhusudhana Rao. It stars N. T. Rama Rao, Shobhan Babu and Kanchana, with music composed by K. V. Mahadevan. The film was recorded as a Super Hit at the box office. It was simultaneously filmed in Tamil as Veera Abhimanyu, with slightly different cast. The film had its climax scene shot in Eastmancolor. The film is considered a breakthrough for Shobhan Babu.

Plot 
The film begins with Arjuna describing the Padmavyuha, i.e. game plan in the lotus shape, to Subhadra which Abhimanyu in her womb is overhearing. At the moment, when Arjuna is about to disclose the exit position, Lord Krishna diverts his attention. Years roll by; by this time, the Pandavas are in exile period when Subhadra resides in Dwaraka. Once in an archery competition, Abhimanyu wins, which irks Lakshmana Kumara and he abuses the Pandavas. Angered, Abhimanyu chases him, when Krishna adroitly swerves him to  Matsya, where the Pandavas driving their Agnathavasam, i.e. live incognito, under different identities. Thereupon, Abhimanyu falls for Uttara, the daughter of King Virata. So, he calls his elder brother Ghatotkacha and intrudes into the palace. Soon, they create chaos which leads to turbulence, and Pandavas in disguise are confounded. During that plight, Krishna appears and resolves the conflict by making Abhimanyu and Ghatotkacha prisoners of Virata. Thereafter, the Pandavas complete their exile and couple up Uttara and Abhimanyu. Right now, Krishna moves as an ambassador to Duryodhana for negotiations, which fail and war erupts. At that moment, Subhadra seeks Krishna to protect her son from the bloodshed when he implies by affirming that only her races are going to rule the earth.

The war begins, and after 10 days Bhishma collapses. Immediately, Duryodhana delegates the chief commander to Drona and solicits to capture Dharmaraja alive. Just as he proclaims until the presence of Arjuna is on the battlefield it is not feasible. So, they intrigue by deploying Arjuna faraway and designing Padmavyuha which any individual is familiar with. As the sphere is vulnerable, to keep the Pandavas saving face, Abhimanyu enters the battlefield. Before long, the remaining force attempts the doorway when Saindhava obstructs their way. Since he upholds a boon of Lord Siva, he bars them. At present, solo Abhimanyu defeats and vanquishes most of the army. Therefore, the malicious Kauravas ploy, all at once attacked and slaughtered Abhimanyu. Learning it, enraged Arjuna vows to eliminate Saidhava before sunset or else shall do self-immolation. The next day, the Kauravas safely hide Saidhava, so, Krishna creates an illusion of sunset when Saindhava appears and Arjuna knocks him out. At last, Subhadra grills Krishna regarding the assurance then he replies, that the child in Uttara's womb is going the rule of earth. Nevertheless, Arjuna needles Krishna for his intentional deed. Therein, Krishna shows his Vishwaroopam, the entire universe in him. Finally, the movie ends with Krishna preaching to Arjuna that human relations are aroused by birth and end by death.

Cast 
N. T. Rama Rao as Lord Krishna
Shobhan Babu as Abhimanyu
Kanchana as Uttara
Kanta Rao as Arjuna
Rajanala as Duryodhana
Mikkilineni as Indra
Dhulipala as Dharma Raju
Satyanarayana as Saindhava
Padmanabham as Uttara Kumarudu
Dandamudi Rajagopal as Bheema
Raavi Kondala Rao as Dronacharya
K.V.S.Sarma as Shakuni
G. Varalakshmi as Draupadi
S. Varalakshmi as Subhadra
Malathi as Sudeshna
Sujatha as Manjula
Geetanjali as Dancer

Production 
Veerabhimanyu revolves around Abhimanyu, a character in the Indian epic Mahabharata. Directed by V. Madhusudhana Rao and produced by Sunderlal Nahta and Dhoondeswara Rao under the banner Rajalakshmi Productions, it was simultaneously produced in Telugu and Tamil languages, the latter as Veera Abhimanyu, which featured a largely different cast. While Shoban Babu played Abhimanyu and N. T. Rama Rao played Krishna in Telugu, they were replaced in Tamil by A. V. M. Rajan and Gemini Ganesan, respectively. Kanchana played Uttara in both versions. Cinematography was handled by Ravi, the editing by N. S. Prakasam, and the art direction by S. Krishna Rao.

Soundtrack 

Music composed by K. V. Mahadevan.

Box office 
The film ran for more than 100 days in 12 centres in Andhra Pradesh.

References

External links 

1965 films
Indian multilingual films
1960s Telugu-language films
Films directed by V. Madhusudhana Rao
Films scored by K. V. Mahadevan
Hindu mythological films
Films based on the Mahabharata